Devil Goddess (1955) is the sixteenth and final Jungle Jim film produced by Columbia Pictures. It features Johnny Weissmuller in his third and last performance as the protagonist adventurer Johnny Weissmuller (a character previously called "Jungle Jim"), and his final film as well. It co-starred Ed Hinton and William Tannen as the film's antagonists, Leopold and Nels Comstock, respectively. Angela Stevens also stars. The film was directed by Spencer G. Bennet and written by Dwight Babcock and George H. Plympton.

The film centers on jungle roamer Weissmuller and his team racing against a few looters for a mystical treasure located in a demon-worshiping land. Filming took place in December 1954. Devil Goddess was theatrically released in the United States in October 1955.

Plot
Adventure-seeker Johnny Weissmuller (as himself) receives a request from Professor Carl Blakely (Selmer Jackson) to collaboratively rescue a certain Professor Dixon (William Blakely) from the Mountain of Explosive Fire in Kirundi. Blakely's daughter Nora (Angela Stevens) comes along. The Kirundi natives belong to a religious tribe worshipping a demon thought to control fire. Pious in nature, they are willing to sacrifice humans just to appease the fire demon, who in fact is Dixon. They are also known to possess mystical items, including a jewel-encrusted sabre.

Notorious looters Leopold (Hinton) and Nels Comstock (Tannen), along with their criminal crew, are looking to steal the Kirundi folks' treasures. They arrive at the strange land the same time Johnny and Blakely do. Jim is tipped off by a contact that his lover Sarabna (Vera M. Francis) is next in line to be sacrificed by the natives. The brave explorer arrives in the nick of time, managing to halt the procession and at the same time finding Dixon. Meanwhile, the looters strike gold but are discovered and killed by the Caucasian-loathing tribesmen.

The Mountain of Explosive Fire, revealed to be an active volcano, erupts suddenly. Johnny evacuates the local people and flees to safety with Blakely, Sarabna, and the fire demon Dixon. In gratitude, the chief presents the team with their precious treasures. Dixon considers donating them to a museum.

Cast
 Johnny Weissmuller
 Angela Stevens
 Selmer Jackson
 William Tannen
 Frank Lackteen
 Vera M. Francis
 Ed Hinton
 William M. Griffith

Production
Johnny Weissmuller played himself, as the protagonist jungle adventurer. It was his third time doing so. After production for Devil Goddess came to a finish, Weissmuller quit acting in feature films  though he made appearances in The Phynx (1970) and Won Ton Ton, the Dog Who Saved Hollywood (1976). The film was Paul Marion's final film too.

The film was directed by Spencer G. Bennet with assistance from Leonard Katzman. Sam Katzman was in charge of production for Columbia Pictures, while George Plympton wrote the screenplay based on a story by Dwight Babcock. Ira Morgan signed on as cinematographer. The set decorator was Sidney Clifford. Mischa Bakaleinikoff headed the musical direction, and Aaron Stell edited the film. Principal photography was completed in about a week's time. It officially began on December 14, 1954, and ended on December 21, 1954.

Not all of the footage in Devil Goddess is original. Archived footage from preceding Jungle Jim films, including Mark of the Tiger (1950), Pygmy Island (1950), Voodoo Tiger (1952), Killer Ape (1953), and Savage Mutiny (1953), is featured in the film.

Release
The film was officially released in the North American cinemas in October 1955. It was critiqued as a "silly jungle film" by the Motion Picture Herald, while the magazine Variety wrote that it was an "almost amateurish attempt at making a formula theme pay off".  In evaluating the film in his 2012 book Columbia Pictures Movie Series, 1926—1955: The Harry Cohn Years, Gene Blottner dubbed Weissmuller's acting in the film as "lack-luster", concluding that it "all life is gone from the series with this entry".

Notes

References

Bibliography

See also
List of American films of 1955

External links
 
 
Review of film at Variety

1955 films
1950s action adventure films
1950s English-language films
Columbia Pictures films
Films directed by Spencer Gordon Bennet
Jungle Jim films
American black-and-white films
Films set in Africa
American action adventure films
Films with screenplays by George H. Plympton
1950s American films